Anilao may refer to various places in the Philippines:

 Anilao, Iloilo

 Anilao, Mabini, Batangas, a resort known for diving and snorkeling